Liu Zongyuan (77328 November 819) was a Chinese philosopher, poet, and politician who lived during the Tang Dynasty. Liu was born in present-day Yongji, Shanxi. Along with Han Yu, he was a founder of the Classical Prose Movement. He has been traditionally classed as one of the "Eight Great Prose Masters of the Tang and Song".

Biography 
Liu Zongyuan was born in 773. His courtesy name was Zihou.

Liu Zongyuan's civil service career was initially successful; however, in 805, he fell out of favour with the imperial government because of his association with a failed reformist movement.  He was exiled first to Yongzhou, Hunan, and then to Liuzhou, Guangxi, where he eventually became the city Governor. A park and temple in Liuzhou is dedicated to his memory. His exile allowed his literary career to flourish: he produced poems, fables, reflective travelogues and essays synthesizing elements of Confucianism, Taoism and Buddhism.

He died in 819.

Works

Liu's best-known travel pieces are the Eight Records of Excursions in Yongzhou (永州八記). Around 180 of his poems are extant, of which five were collected in the anthology Three Hundred Tang Poems. Some of his works celebrate his freedom from office, while others mourn his banishment.

One of his most famous poems is "Jiangxue", translated into English as "River Snow" or "Winter Snow". The poem has been an inspiration for many works of Chinese painting.
{|
! style="width:10em;"|
! style="width:45em;"|
|-
|

|
 River Snow
A thousand mountains, no sign of birds in flight; 
Ten thousand paths, no trace of human tracks. 
In a lone boat, an old man, in rain hat and straw raincoat,
Fishing alone, in the cold river snow.
|}

Liu Zongyuan wrote Fei Guoyu (Argument against the Harangues of the Various States), a criticism of Guoyu. In response, Liu Zhang (劉 章,  1095–1177); Jiang Duanli; and Yu Pan (  1300), Yu Ji's (虞 集, 1272–1348) younger brother, wrote texts titled Fei Fei Guoyu (Argument against the Argument against the Harangues of the Various States) in opposition to Liu Zongyuan's essay.

See also
Classical Chinese poetry
List of Three Hundred Tang Poems poets
Tang poetry

References

Works cited 
Chen, Jo-shui, Liu Tsung-yüan and Intellectual Change in T'ang China, 773–819, Cambridge: Cambridge University Press, 1992. .
Nienhauser Jr., William H.; Hartmann, Charles; Crawford, William Bruce; Walls, Jan W.; Neighbors, Lloyd, Liu Tsung-yüan, New York: Twayne Publishers Inc., 1973.

External links
Liu Zongyuan in Wengu textbase, five poems in traditional Chinese arrayed with Bynner's translation.
Biography and translations of five poems. (Translated by Tony Barnstone and Chou Ping)
 
 
Books of the Quan Tangshi that include collected poems of Liu Zongyuan at the Chinese Text Project:
Book 350
Book 351
Book 352
Book 353

773 births
819 deaths
8th-century Chinese philosophers
8th-century Chinese poets
9th-century Chinese philosophers
9th-century Chinese poets
Poets from Shanxi
Politicians from Yuncheng
Tang dynasty essayists
Tang dynasty politicians from Shanxi
Three Hundred Tang Poems poets